Capriocornites is a genus of rutoceratids (Nautiloidea - Cephalopoda) from the Devonian, related to such genera as Rutoceras and Goldringia.

In some taxonomies (Manda & Turek, 2009) the Rutoceratidae are included in the Oncocerida rather than in the Nautilida

References

 Stepan Manda & Voitech Turek, 2009.  Revision of the Pagian Rutoceratoidea Hyatt, 1884 (Nautiloidea, Oncocerida) from the Prague Basin. Bulletin of Geosciences 84(1), 127–148 (13 figures). Czech Geological Survey, Prague 
 Barnhard Kummel, 1964. Nautiloidea-Nautilida. Treatise on Invertebrate Paleontology, Part K. Geological Society of America and University of Kansas Press.
 J.J. Sepkoski 2002. List of Cephalopod genera. 

Prehistoric nautiloid genera

Ageing